The 1981 Argentine Grand Prix was the third race of the 1981 Formula One World Championship and was held at the Buenos Aires circuit in Argentina on 12 April 1981. This was the last Argentine Grand Prix until 1995. Thanks to designer Gordon Murray's alternative solution to flexible side skirts, the Brabham cars of Nelson Piquet and Héctor Rebaque were dominant in this race, with Piquet (who took pole at an average speed of 130.029 mph (209.261 km/h)) taking the lead immediately from Alan Jones on the back straight and Rebaque climbing up from 5th to 2nd over 23 laps.

Classification

Qualifying

Race

Championship standings after the race 

Drivers' Championship standings

Constructors' Championship standings

References

Further reading
 

Argentine Grand Prix
Argentine Grand Prix
Grand Prix
Argentine Grand Prix